The Vieux Fort River is a river in Saint Lucia. It flows south-southeast, reaching the coast close to the country's southernmost point at the town of Vieux Fort.   It is named after a fort that used to watch out towards Saint Vincent towards the south.

See also
List of rivers of Saint Lucia
Little Vieux Fort River
Vieux Fort, Saint Lucia

References

Rivers of Saint Lucia